The CBI Book of the Year Awards, previously known as the Bisto Book of the Year Awards, are literary awards presented annually in the Republic of Ireland to writers and illustrators of books for children and young people. The Awards are run by Children's Books Ireland (CBI) and are open to authors and illustrators born or resident in Ireland; books may be written in English or Irish. Many bestselling, internationally renowned authors have won a "Bisto", including Eoin Colfer, John Boyne and several times winner Kate Thompson.

The awards were sponsored by Bisto (Premier Foods) from their inception.

First awarded in 1990 (with the Book of the Decade Awards), prizes are awarded in three categories:
 CBI Book of the Year Award
 Eilís Dillon Award for a First Children's Book, named in honour of writer Eilís Dillon
 three Merit Awards, which in 2012 were:
Judges' Special Recognition Award
CBI Honour Award for Illustration
CBI Honour Award for Writing

The winner of Book of the Year wins a perpetual trophy and €10,000; the 3 winners of the Merit Award share a combined prize fund of €6,000; the Eilís Dillon Award winner for first time writers also wins a trophy and €3,000.

In 2010, the Children's Choice award was introduced to mark the 20th anniversary of the Bisto Book of the Year Awards. It was chosen by 10 Junior Juries from all around Ireland, and was awarded to Jane Mitchell's Chalkline. The Judges' Special Recognition Award was not awarded in 2010.

Past winners

Source: Children's Books Ireland

Book of the Year Award

Merit Awards

Éilís Dillon Award for a First Children's Book

Awards in discontinued categories 

Best Emerging Author (1991) – Brian Boru by Morgan Llywelyn, O'Brien Press
Book for Young Readers (1991) – Grandma's Bill by Martin Waddell, Simon & Schuster
Illustration (1991) – Fairy Tales of Ireland by P. J. Lynch, Collins
Historical Fiction (1992) – Wildflower Girl by Marita Conlon-McKenna, O'Brien Press
Picture Book (1992) – The Sleeping Giant by Marie-Louise Fitzpatrick, Brandon Books
First Children's Novel (1992) – The Secret of the Ruby Ring by Yvonne MacGrory, Children's Press
Information Book (1993) – Tamall sa Chistin by Mairin Uí Chomain, An Gúm
Teenage Fiction (1993) – Put a Saddle on the Pig by Sam McBratney, Methuen
Historical Fiction (1993) – Strongbow by Morgan Llywelyn, O'Brien Press

Bisto Children's Book of the Decade (1980–1990) 
Fiction:
Run with the Wind;
Run to Earth;
Run Swift; Run Free 
by Tom McCaughren, Jeanette Dunne (Wolfhound Press)

Information Books:
Exploring the Book of Kells: Brendan the Navigator 
by George Otto Simms, David Rooney (O'Brien Press)

Books for Young Readers: Grandma's Bill by Martin Waddell, illus. Jane Johnson (Simon & Schuster)

Irish Language:
An Chanáil
by Marie-Louise Fitzpatrick, transl. Bernadine Nic Ghiolla Phádraig An Gúm

Winners of multiple awards 

Most Bisto Book of the Year Awards: Kate Thompson (4), Marie-Louise Fitzpatrick (4), Siobhán Dowd (2), Chris Haughton (2)
Most Merit Awards: Oliver Jeffers (9), Kate Thompson (3), P. J. Lynch (3)
Most Bisto Awards (total): Oliver Jeffers (10), Marie-Louise Fitzpatrick (10), Kate Thompson (7), P. J. Lynch (5), Gerard Whelan (4), Siobhán Dowd (4), Chris Haughton (4), Siobhán Parkinson (3), Éilis Ni Dhuibhne/Elizabeth O'Hara (3)

References

External links
 

Irish children's literary awards
Awards established in 1990